INS Talwar  (F40) (translated as "Sword") is the lead ship of the s of the Indian Navy. Its name means "Sword" in Hindi (see Talwar). She was built in Russia, and commissioned into the Indian Navy on 18 June 2003.

Talwar is a multirole frigate and true to her name, has participated in various operations and exercises since her commissioning, including anti-piracy operations off the coast of Somalia.

Design

Talwar is the lead ship of her class of frigates. The Talwar-class guided missile frigates are modified Krivak III-class frigates built by Russia. Much of the equipment on the ship is Russian-made, but a significant number of systems of Indian origin have also been incorporated.

Operational history

Talwar was built by the Baltiyskiy shipyard. She was launched in May 2000. Delivery to the Indian Navy was scheduled for May 2002 after running, state and acceptance trials. Sea trials were completed in the Baltic Sea on 29 May 2002. The ship was commissioned formally into the Indian Navy on 18 June 2003 by (later Vice Admiral) Satish Soni. INS Talwar arrived home at Mumbai's Naval Dockyard on 12 August 2003, after a long journey from St. Petersburg.

Service history

INS Talwar has been deployed around the Indian Ocean, making friendly visits at various ports. She has also participated in various exercises including Malabar 2008 with the United States Navy, multinational maritime exercise ‘Cutlass Express 2021 (CE21) and with the French Navy.

Anti-piracy measures off the Somali coast

On 28 May 2009, INS Talwar, while escorting three merchant vessels - Maud, Southern Independence and Aramis. The frigate immediately dispatched its Chetak helicopter armed with 7.62mm light machine guns which spotted pirates scrambling up a ladder hooked to MV Maud. The helicopter fired on the two pirates on the ladder and they fell into the sea. Simultaneously, the frigate sent its naval commandos on Prahar high-speed inflatables to intercept the skiff. Six pirates were disarmed and their cache of Kalashnikov assault rifles, Katyushka rockets, a rocket launcher, flares and mobile phones were seized. Since the freighters were still in dangerous waters and needed escort, the frigate left the disarmed pirates to drift on the high seas after emptying their skiff's fuel tank and disabling it. The pirates were later arrested by warships from the global task force in a follow-up action.

The ship is affiliated with the 16th Cavalry of the Indian Army and continues to be a frontline warship of the Indian Navy's Western Fleet

References

Talwar-class frigates
Frigates of the Indian Navy
2000 ships
Ships built at the Baltic Shipyard